Charities Act may refer to acts of the legislature in various countries:

Australia:
Charities Act 1978 in Victoria
Hospitals and Charities Act 1922 in Victoria
Charities Funds Act 1958 in Queensland
Collections for Charities Act 2001 in Tasmania,

Barbados:
Charities Act 1979

Canada:
Charities Act R.S.P.E.I. 1988 in Prince Edward Island

Ireland:
Charities Act 2009
Charities Act 2020 in the United States
Charities Act 2005 in New Zealand

Singapore:
Charities Act

United Kingdom:
Charities Act 1992
Charities Act 1993
Charities Act 2006
Charities Act 2011
Charities Act 2022
Medical Charities Act
Recreational Charities Act 1958